Temple Newsam is a ward in the metropolitan borough of the City of Leeds, West Yorkshire, England.  It contains 51 listed buildings that are recorded in the National Heritage List for England.  Of these, two are listed at Grade I, the highest of the three grades, three are at Grade II*, the middle grade, and the others are at Grade II, the lowest grade.  The ward is to the east of the centre of Leeds, it is largely residential, and contains the suburbs of Colton, Halton, Halton Moor and Whitkirk.  The most important building in the ward is Temple Newsam House, which is listed, together with associated structures and buildings in the surrounding park.  Most of the other listed buildings are houses, cottages and associated structures, farmhouses and farm buildings.  The rest include churches and associated structures, a former windmill and mill buildings, two railway bridges, and a school.


Key

Buildings

References

Citations

Sources

 

Lists of listed buildings in West Yorkshire